Speer is a surname. 

 Ashkenazim:  a spelling variation of Speyer, a name indicative of origin from the German city of Speyer
 Middle High German and Middle Dutch: sper, meaning "spear"
 Scottish and northern Irish : a spelling variation of Speir, from the Old French espier meaning "to watch"

Notable people with the surname include:
Albert Friedrich Speer, (1863–1947), German architect, father of Albert Speer
Albert Speer, (1905–1981), German architect, Minister of Armaments and War Production of Nazi Germany from 1942 to 1945
Albert Speer (born 1934), (1934–2017), a German architect and city planner, son of Albert Speer
Bill Speer, a retired professional ice hockey player
Christian P. Speer, (born 1952) German pediatrician and Professor of Pediatrics
Christopher Speer, Sergeant First Class (SFC), a U.S. special forces soldier killed in Afghanistan
Dieter Speer, a former German biathlete
Dick Speer, founder of CCI, brother of Vernon Speer
Emory Speer, a U.S. politician, soldier, and lawyer who served in the U.S. House of Representatives from 1878 to 1882
Floyd Speer, also known as Floyd Vernie Speer, a U.S. professional baseball pitcher
Daniel Speer, also known as Georg Daniel Speer, a German composer, and writer of the Baroque
Hilde Schramm (born 1936), née Speer, a German politician, and daughter of Albert Speer
Hugo Speer, an English actor, born in 1968
Jack Speer, also known as John “Jack” Bristol Speer, a judge, Washington state representative, and a science fiction fan 
Jillian Speer, a U.S. singer-songwriter and musician
Margret Nissen (born 1938), née Speer, a German photographer, and daughter of Albert Speer
Mark Speer, American musician and guitarist
Noah Wyle, also known as Noah Strausser Speer Wyle, a U.S. TV, and film actor
Peter Moore Speer, a Republican member of the U.S. House of Representatives from Pennsylvania
Robert Elliott Speer, a U.S. religious leader (1867–1947) and authority on missions
Robert M. Speer, acting United States Secretary of the Army (2017- )
Robert Milton Speer, a Democratic member of the U.S. House of Representatives from Pennsylvania 
Robert W. Speer, also known as Robert Walter Speer, mayor of Denver, Colorado from 1904–1912
Roy Speer, the financial backing behind the Home Shopping Network
Scott Speer, an American music video director
The Speer Family, a Southern Gospel family group founded in 1921
Stewie Speer, an Australian drummer best known as a member of the 1960s–70s group Max Merritt & The Meteors
Susan Speer, a British psychologist
Thomas J. Speer, also known as Thomas Jefferson Speer, a U.S. Representative from Georgia
Thomas M Speers, First Chief of Police of Kansas City, Missouri   1874-1895
Tom Speer, a U.S. professional mixed martial artist
Vernon Speer, founder of Speer Bullets, brother of Dick Speer
W. G. Speer, the second head football coach for the Fort Hays State University Tigers in Hays, Kansas
William Speer, a pioneer American Presbyterian missionary and pastor to the Chinese

See also 
Spear (surname)
Speir
Speers